Shai is a given name.  Notable people with the name include:

Shai Bolton (born 1998), Australian rules footballer 
Shai Gilgeous-Alexander (born 1998), Canadian professional basketball player
Shai Hope (born 1993), Barbadian cricketer
Shai Linne (born 1974), American Christian rapper
Shai Reshef, Israeli businessperson and academic administrator